The American Federation for Aging Research (AFAR) is a private, charitable, 501(c)(3), organization whose mission is to provide funding for biomedical research on aging. It was founded in 1981.

References

External links
Official website
healthcompass.org
infoaging.org

Life extension organizations
Medical and health organizations based in New York (state)
501(c)(3) organizations